The Temple of Jupiter Stator ("Jupiter the Sustainer") was a sanctuary at the foot of the Palatine Hill in Rome.  In Roman legend, it was founded by King Romulus after he pledged to build it during a battle between the Roman army and that of the Sabines. However, no temple was actually built on the site until the early 3rd century BC.

Legend
The Battle of the Lacus Curtius took place in the Forum area between Romulus and Tatius, king of the Sabines. The Romans had been forced to retreat uphill on the Via Sacra. However, at the Porta Mugonia, Romulus prayed to Jupiter and vowed him a temple if he stemmed the Sabine advance. The Romans regrouped and held their ground, staving off defeat.

On that spot, according to Livy 1.12.6, probably near or just outside the Porta, Romulus vowed to build the temple, if Jupiter caused the Romans to stop fleeing. And yet in Livy 10.36.11 the same story is told again about the consul Marcus Atilius Regulus, who made a similar vow in a similar situation, when the Romans were losing a battle against the Samnites in 294 BC, but they miraculously turned around, regrouped and held their ground against the enemy. Some scholars believe that the story of the earlier foundation by Romulus was a later pseudo-tradition.

On November 8, 63 BC, it was in this temple, close to the Palatine Hill, that the senate convened to hear the consul Marcus Tullius Cicero deliver the first of his famous Catiline Orations against his enemy Lucius Catilina. This temple was also the place where Cicero imagined himself, 19 years later, delivering his Second Philippic oration against Mark Antony, although that speech was never actually given.

The temple was destroyed in the Great Fire of Rome during Nero's reign in July of 64 CE.

Location
Written sources locate the temple just in front of the gate of the Palatine Hill leading to the Sacred Way. For example, Ovid (Fasti 6.794) mentions the temple of Stator "which Romulus once founded in front of the mouth of the Palatine Hill". However, the exact location of this gate, the Porta Mugonia, is not known with absolute certainty.

Livy states that the temple was located near the royal palace at the time of the death of Lucius Tarquinius Priscus, near the "new street" (nova via) and that Queen Tanaquil addressed the people from the palace window.

There is a fair amount of consensus on a location just besides the Arch of Titus on the northern slope of the Palatine Hill. When a medieval tower was demolished in 1827, the ruins of an ancient building appeared, and the remains are frequently identified as the foundations of the temple.

The Italian archaeologist Filippo Coarelli places it closer to the forum, between the Temple of Antoninus and Faustina and the Basilica of Maxentius, where the Temple of Romulus stands. His line of reasoning is based on the course of the Via Sacra before the construction of the Basilica of Maxentius, the known borders of the ancient administrative regions of the city and the literary sources listing the monuments in each region. The location near the Arch of Titus does not fit since it is in the wrong administrative region and not in the right position relative to the other buildings listed by ancient writers, but the Temple of Romulus on the Via Sacra is a perfect match.

The name Stator
The Latin word  (the a is short, cf. Ovid Fasti 6.794, Tristia 3.1.31) has two possible meanings, one "stander, attendant" from the intransitive verb  "I stand", the other "he who makes someone stand", from the transitive verb  "I cause to stand". The second meaning is the one intended here. The Oxford Latin Dictionary translates it as "one who establishes or upholds", Lewis and Short's Latin Dictionary as "stayer, supporter". 

Livy similarly connects the name  with the verb  in Romulus's prayer to Jupiter made at the moment when Romulus vowed to build a temple: "Take away the Romans' terror, and stay their disgraceful fleeing; here I vow a temple to you, the Stayer Jupiter, to be a reminder to posterity that the city was saved with your present help." In his account of the year 294 BC, he connects it with  "I stand firm":  "(Regulus) vowed a temple to Jupiter the Stayer, if the Roman battle line stood firm".

See also
List of Ancient Roman temples

References

Further reading 

 Huskey, Samuel J. (2006). Ovid's (Mis)Guided Tour of Rome: Some Purposeful Omissions in "Tr." 3.1. The Classical Journal, Vol. 102, No. 1, pp. 17-39.
 Tomei, Maria Antonietta. 1993. “Sul tempio di Giove Statore al Palatino.” Mélanges de l’École Française de Rome. Antiquité 105: 621–659.
 Watmough, Margaret M. T. (1995/96). "The Suffix -tor-: Agent-Noun Formation in Latin and the Other Italic Languages". Glotta, 1995/1996, pp. 80–115.
 Wiseman, T.P. 2017. "Iuppiter Stator in Palatio. A New Solution to an Old Puzzle." Mitteilungen des Deutschen Arch. Inst. Rom. Abt 123: 13–45.
 Ziółkowski, Adam. 1989. “The Sacra Via and the Temple of Iuppiter Stator.” Opuscula Romana  XVII: 225–239.

External links 

 Sights
 Forum  temple

Jupiter Stator
Stator
Destroyed temples